The 2013 World Ladies Snooker Championship was the 2013 edition of the World Women's Snooker Championship, first held in 1976, and was played at Cambridge Snooker Centre from 14 to 15 April. The tournament was won by Reanne Evans, who achieved her ninth consecutive world title by defeating Maria Catalano 6–3 in the final, compiling two  breaks during the match, including a 117 that was the highest of the tournament. 

There were four round-robin qualifying groups, each of five players, with the top three players in each group progressing into the knockout stage. The 2013 World Women's Billiards Championship, won by Emma Bonney, and a doubles snooker event, won by Ng On-yee and So Man Yan, were organised alongside the main snooker championship.

Main Draw

References 

2013 in English sport
2013 in snooker
2013 in women's sport
International sports competitions hosted by England
2013
April 2013 sports events in the United Kingdom